Liga Deportiva Universitaria de Quito's 2018 season was the club's 88th year of existence, the 65th year in professional football, and the 57th in the top level of professional football in Ecuador.

Club

Personnel
President: Guillermo Romero
Honorary President: Rodrigo Paz
President of the Executive Commission: Esteban Paz
President of the Football Commission: Patricio Torres
Sporting manager: Santiago Jácome

Coaching staff
Manager: Pablo Repetto
Assistant manager: Óscar Quagliatta, Franklin Salas
Physical trainer: Roberto Teixeira
Goalkeeper trainer: Luis Preti

Kits
Supplier: Puma
Sponsor(s): Chevrolet, Discover, Pilsener

Squad information

Note: Caps and goals are of the national league and are current as of the beginning of the season.

Winter transfers

Summer transfers

Competitions

Pre-season friendlies

Other friendlies

Serie A

The 2018 season was Liga's 57th season in the Serie A and their 17th consecutive. The format was identical to the previous season.

First stage

Results summary

Results by round

Second stage

Results summary

Results by round

Finals

Results summary

Results by round

CONMEBOL Sudamericana

L.D.U. Quito qualified to the 2018 CONMEBOL Sudamericana—their 11th participation in the continental tournament—as the 8th place of the 2017 Serie A. They entered the competition in the first stage.

CONMEBOL Sudamericana squad

Source:

First stage

Tied 4–4 on aggregate, LDU Quito won on away goals and advanced to the second stage.

Second stage

LDU Quito won 3–2 on aggregate and advanced to the round of 16 (Match H).

Round of 16

Tied 1–1 on aggregate, Deportivo Cali won on penalties and advanced to the quarterfinals.

Player statistics

Note: Players in italics left the club mid-season.

Team statistics

References

External links
  

2018
Ecuadorian football clubs 2018 season